Bernard MacLaverty (born 14 September 1942) is an Irish fiction writer and novelist. His novels include Cal and Grace Notes. He has written five books of short stories.

Biography
MacLaverty was born in Belfast, Northern Ireland, and educated at Holy Family Primary School in the Duncairn district and then at St Malachy's College. He worked as a medical laboratory technician and was a mature student at Queen's University Belfast. He lived there until 1975, when he moved to Scotland with his wife, Madeline, and four children (Ciara, Claire, John, and Jude). He initially lived in Edinburgh and then the Isle of Islay before settling in the West End of Glasgow.

He was Writer-in-Residence at the Universities of Aberdeen, Liverpool John Moores, Augsburg and Iowa State.  He was the Ireland Fund Artist-in-Residence in the Celtic Studies Department of St. Michael's College, University of Toronto in October 2007.

Work

MacLaverty's 1980 novel Lamb is about faith, relationships and, ultimately, love; Cal is an examination of love in the midst of violence. Grace Notes, which was shortlisted for the 1997 Booker Prize, is about the conflict between a desire to compose and motherhood. The Anatomy School is a comedic coming-of-age novel. He has also written five acclaimed collections of short stories, most of which are in his Collected Stories (Cape, 2013).

MacLaverty wrote a screenplay for Cal in 1984; Helen Mirren and John Lynch starred and Mark Knopfler composed the film soundtrack. He also adapted Lamb for the screen; Liam Neeson and Hugh O'Conor starred and Van Morrison composed the soundtrack.

MacLaverty has written versions of his fiction for other media – radio plays, television plays, screenplays and libretti. In 2003 he wrote and directed a short film Bye-Child (BAFTA-nominated for "Best Short Film") and more recently wrote libretti for Scottish Opera's Five:15 series The King’s Conjecture, with music by Gareth Williams, and The Letter with music by Vitaly Khodosh. For Scottish Opera in 2012, and again with music by Gareth Williams, he wrote The Elephant Angel, an opera for schools, which toured Scotland and Northern Ireland.

List of published works

Novels:
 Lamb, Cape / Blackstaff Press (1980)
 Cal, Cape / Blackstaff Press (1983)
 Grace Notes, Cape / Blackstaff Press (1997)
 The Anatomy School, Cape / Blackstaff Press (2001)
 Midwinter Break: A Novel, W. W. Norton & Company (2017)

Short story collections:
 Secrets & Other Stories, Blackstaff Press (1977)
 A Time to Dance & Other Stories, Cape / Blackstaff Press (1982)
 The Great Profundo & Other Stories, Cape / Blackstaff Press (1987)
 Walking the Dog & Other Stories, Cape / Blackstaff Press (1994)
 Matters of Life & Death & Other Stories, Cape (2006)
 Collected Stories, Cape (2013)
 Blank Pages and Other Stories, Cape (2021)

See also

 List of Northern Irish writers
 The Dawning

References

Further reading
 Parker, Geoffrey (1983), An Interview with Brian Moore & Bernard MacLaverty in Hearn, Sheila G. (ed.), Cencrastus No. 14, Autumn 1983, pp. 2 - 4,

External links

 Official website
 Bernard MacLaverty at Aosdána
 
 Bernard MacLaverty at British Council, Literature site
 "Award-winning author to teach Creative Writing at Aberdeen", University of Abberdeen, 27 October 2006
 Writing page BBC Northern Ireland

1942 births
Living people
Academics of the University of Aberdeen
Alumni of Queen's University Belfast
Aosdána members
Male novelists from Northern Ireland
People associated with Glasgow
People educated at St Malachy's College
Writers from Belfast
Scottish novelists
Scottish short story writers
Male short story writers from Northern Ireland
21st-century writers from Northern Ireland